Confusion Bay is the second album by Danish metal band Raunchy. It was recorded at Hansen Studios in July 2003 and produced by Jacob Hansen. The album gained great reviews and is by many still considered to be the best Raunchy album.During the recordings, Raunchy did a cover track of Faith No More's "From Out of Nowhere," which was released in 2007 on Velvet Noise Extended.

Cover and all promotion art is done by guitarist Lars Christensen.

In 2009, Confusion Bay and Velvet Noise were reissued through Metal Mind Productions as limited edition digipaks limited to 2000 copies. Both are remastered, and feature new liner notes.

Track listing

Videography

Personnel 
 Lars Vognstrup – Vocals
 Jesper Tilsted – Guitars
 Lars Christensen – Guitars
 Jeppe Christensen – Keyboards, Vocals
 Jesper Kvist – Bass
 Morten Toft Hansen – Drums

References

2004 albums
Raunchy (band) albums
Albums produced by Jacob Hansen